The Comunidade Intermunicipal do Alto Alentejo (English: Upper Alentejo) is an administrative division in Portugal. It was created in 2009. The seat of the intermunicipal community is Portalegre. Alto Alentejo is coterminous with the former Portalegre District. The population in 2011 was 118,506, in an area of 6,084.34 km². Together with Alentejo Central it covers the area of the former Alto Alentejo Province. With Ponte de Sor the intermunicipal community also includes one municipality that lies in the area of the former Ribatejo Province.

Alto Alentejo is also a NUTS3 subregion of Alentejo Region, in Portugal. Since January 2015, the NUTS 3 subregion covers the same area as the intermunicipal community.

Municipalities
The CIM Alto Alentejo is composed of 15 municipalities:

References

External links

Official website CIM Alto Alentejo

Intermunicipal communities of Portugal